The Kari, Cari, or Chariar were one of the ten indigenous Great Andamanese peoples, originally living on the northernmost part of North Andaman Island and on Landfall Island in the Indian Ocean.

The Cari spoke a distinctive language, Aka-Cari, closely related to the other Great Andamanese languages.  They were exclusively shore-dwellers (aryoto).

History
The Cari population at the time of first European contacts (in the 1790s) has been estimated at 100 individuals, out of perhaps 3500 Great Andamanese.
Like other Andamanese peoples, the Cari were decimated during colonial and post-colonial times, by diseases, alcohol, colonial warfare and loss of territory. The population was down to 39 individuals in the 1901 census, falling to 36 in 1911, 17 in 1921, and 9 in 1931.

In 1949 any remaining Cari were relocated, together with all other surviving Great Andamanese,  to a reservation on Bluff island; and then again in 1969 to a reservation on Strait Island.

By 1994, the population was reduced to only two women, aged 57 and 59, and therefore was on its way to extinction. They are a designated Scheduled Tribe.

References

Ethnic groups in the Andaman and Nicobar Islands
Scheduled Tribes of the Andaman and Nicobar Islands